Bulinidae is a family of gastropods in the superfamily Lymnaeoidea

Genera
Subfamily Bulininae Fischer & Crosse, 1880
Bulinus Müller, 1781
 Hopeiella Yü & Pan, 1982 †
Indoplanorbis Annandale, Prashad & Amid-ud-Din, 1921
 Macrophysa Meek, 1865 †
 Popovicia Neubauer & Harzhauser in Neubauer et al., 2015 †
Subfamily Plesiophysinae Bequaert & Clench, 1939
Plesiophysa Fischer, 1883

References

 Bouchet P., Rocroi J.P., Hausdorf B., Kaim A., Kano Y., Nützel A., Parkhaev P., Schrödl M. & Strong E.E. (2017). Revised classification, nomenclator and typification of gastropod and monoplacophoran families. Malacologia. 61(1-2): 1-526

 
Gastropod families